Gianni Polhemus is a road bike racer from New York State.
His large wins in 2011 include.
 Tour of Battenkill juniors
 New York State road, Time trial, and criterium

Championships
 New York State Road, Criterium, Time Trial championships.

References

Year of birth missing (living people)
Living people
American male cyclists